Now or Never may refer to:

Film and television 
 Now or Never (1921 film), a silent film starring Harold Lloyd
 Now or Never (1935 film)
 Now or Never (1979 film), a film featuring Tally Brown
 Now or Never (1998 film), a film by Jean Pierre Lefebvre
 Now or Never (2003 film), a comedy-drama film by Lucio Pellegrini
 "Now or Never" (Grey's Anatomy), an episode of Grey's Anatomy
 Now or Never, a British morning show in the ITV Day programming block

Music

Band

Albums
 Now or Never (Bananarama EP) (2012)
 Now or Never (Blazin' Squad album) (2003)
 Now or Never (Brett Kissel album) (2020)
 Now or Never (Nick Carter album) (2002)
 Now or Never (CNBLUE EP) (2009)
 Now or Never (Lead album) (2003)
 Now or Never (Tank album) (2010)
 Now or Never (Tela album) (1998)
 Now or Never, a 2015 mix-tape by Mumzy Stranger
 Now or Never, a 1981 album by John Schneider

Songs
 "Now or Never" (Billie Holiday song) (1949)
 "Now or Never" (Yoko Ono song) (1972)
 "Now or Never" (Mark Medlock song) (2007)
 "Now or Never" (High School Musical song) (2008)
 "Now or Never" (Jodie Connor song) (2011)
 "Now or Never" (Outasight song) (2012)
 "Now or Never" (Halsey song) (2017)
 "Now or Never", a 2009 song by CNBLUE
 "Now or Never", a 2010 song by Confide from Recover
 "Now or Never", a 2001 song by Dope from Life
 "Now or Never", a 2007 song by Everlife from Everlife
 "Now or Never", a 1998 song by Godsmack from Godsmack
 "Now or Never", a 1984 song by Grim Reaper from See You in Hell
 "Now or Never", a 2006 song by Josh Groban from Awake
 "Now or Never", a 2007 song by Madina Lake from From Them, Through Us, to You
 "Now or Never", a 2012 song by Kendrick Lamar from Good Kid, M.A.A.D City
 "Now or Never", a 2018 song by SF9
 "Now or Never", a 2003 song by Three Days Grace from the album Three Days Grace
 "Now or Never", a 2013 song by Tritonal featuring vocals by Phoebe Ryan
 "Now or Never", a 2000 song by Zebrahead from Playmate of the Year
 "Now or Never", a 2019 song by Lacuna Coil from Black Anima

Other uses 
 "Now or Never; Are We to Live or Perish Forever?" or the Pakistan Declaration, a pamphlet by Choudhary Rahmat Ali
 "Now or Never" (radio show), a Canadian radio documentary series broadcast on CBC Radio One

See also 
 It's Now or Never (disambiguation)